Cəfərli, Jalilabad may refer to:
Cəfərli (39° 10' N 48° 26' E), Jalilabad
Cəfərli (39° 11' N 48° 13' E), Jalilabad